Krebsbach is a small river in Bavaria, Germany. It flows into the Steinach near Schneckenlohe.

See also
List of rivers of Bavaria

Rivers of Bavaria
Rivers of Germany